Face-to-face interaction is social communication carried out without any mediating technology. It is defined as the mutual influence of individuals’ direct physical presence with their body language and verbal language. It is one of the basic elements of a social system, forming a significant part of socialization and experience throughout an individual's lifetime. It is also central to the development of groups and organizations composed of those individuals. Face-to-face interaction not only allows people to communicate more directly, but has been shown to improve mental health and can reduce various mental illnesses, most commonly, depression and anxiety.

Studies on face-to-face interaction 
Most research and studies on face-to-face interaction is done via direct observation; the goal is to explain the regularities in the actions observed in these interactions. The study of face-to-face interaction examines its organization, rules, and strategy. It has been of interest to scholars since at least the early 20th century. One of the earliest social science scholars to analyze this type of interaction was sociologist Georg Simmel. He defined a society as a number of individuals intertwined by various interactions. In his 1908 book, he observed that sensory organs play an important role in interaction, discussing examples of human behavior such as eye contact.  His insights were soon developed by others, including Charles Cooley and George Herbert Mead. Their theories became known as symbolic interactionism; and have since opened the door to a variety and wide range of other theories.  Symbolic interactionists are more concerned with subjective meaning rather than objective structure. They focus on how individuals interpret subjective meaning, which leads them to understand how that individual views the world as well as how the repetition of meaningful interactions among individuals is the groundwork to define the formation of society. By the mid-20th century, there was already a sizable scholarly literature on various aspects of face-to-face interaction. Works on this topic have been published by scholars such as Erving Goffman and Eliot Chapple.

Mediated communication 
Historically, mediated communication was much rarer than face-to-face. Even though humans have possessed the technology to communicate in space and time (e.g. writing) for millennia, the majority of the world's population lacked the necessary skills, such as literacy, to use them. This began to change with the invention of the printing press by Johannes Gutenberg that led to the spread of printed texts and rising literacy in Europe from the 15th century. Since then, face-to-face interaction has begun to steadily lose ground to mediated communication.

Compared with mediated communication 
Face-to-face communication has been however described as less preferable to mediated communication in some situations, particularly where time and geographical distance are an issue. For example, in maintaining a long-distance friendship, face-to-face communication was only the fourth most common way of maintaining ties, after telephone, email, and instant messaging.

Despite the advent of many new information and communication technologies, face-to-face interaction is still widespread and popular and has a better performance in many different areas. Nardi and Whittaker (2002) pointed that face-to-face communication is still the golden standard among the mediated technologies based on many theorists, particularly in the context of the media richness theory where face-to-face communication is described as the most efficient and informational one. This is explained because face-to-face communication engages more human senses than mediated communication. Face-to-face interaction is also a useful way for people when they want to win over others based on verbal communication, or when they try to settle disagreements.  Besides, it does help a lot for teachers as one effective teaching method. It is also easier to keep a stronger and more active political connection with others by face-to-face interaction.

In the end, there are both pros and cons to each form of communication. Several studies compared the two groups in order to determine the advantages and disadvantages of each. One group was communicating only through face-to-face communication, while the other was communicating only through computer-mediated communication. These studies found that computer-mediated groups perform better than face-to-face groups on idea generation tasks, while face-to-face groups excel in social emotional exchange. This is because face-to-face groups have more tension release and agreement statements, while computer-mediated groups have a tendency of giving more suggestions, opinions, and formal expressions. There is a greater equality of participation in computer-mediated groups, but there's also a higher rate of uninhibited behaviour because computer-mediated groups induce a greater loss of self-awareness. There is generally a reduced sense of social pressure in computer-mediated groups, but there is a stronger perception and sense of understanding in face-to-face groups.

Face-to-face interactions versus social media 
Talking to someone face to face gives a person non-verbal cues, such as smiling, physical movement, and body positions that help people communicate. However, since social media lacks face-to-face communication, some individuals have adapted to blind communication when speaking online, seen through texting, commenting, and sending/receiving messages.

By nature, humans are social. Social interaction is essential to survival. With recent advances in technology, such as the Internet, instant messaging, and smartphones, forms many channels and ways to interact with others. However, the human brain has evolved to adapt and keep up with this flood of mass communication. While face-to-face communication is predicted to improve quality of life, Internet and social media communication did not. The Internet opens a new realm of possibilities in connecting with people around the globe with inherent factors in online communication that limit its ability to promote the same level of social satisfaction as traditional face-to-face communication. There are significant differences between online and face-to-face communication, leading to online communication being less emotionally satisfying and fulfilling than face-to-face communication. Social interaction on the internet and through social media platforms makes the interaction considerably difficult to distinguish nonverbal cues.  Transitive memory development is also brought by face-to-face communication, which is more effective than online communication.

While technology has been able to bring communities and people closer together, humans have a responsibility to cultivate those connections and nurture them through old-fashioned face-to-face communication. As a human species, continuing to connect with others without hiding behind electronic screens is crucial.

Cross multicultures 
Although there are increasingly virtual communications in large transnational companies with the development of Internet, face-to-face interaction is still a crucial tool in communication between employees and staff workers. Face-to-face interaction is beneficial to understand underlying truths that are presented through emotion and body language, especially when there are language and cultural differences present amongst individuals.

Cooperation in a multicultural team requires knowledge sharing. Ambiguous knowledge which arises frequently in a multicultural team is inevitable because of the different language habits. Face-to-face communication is better than other virtual communications for the ambiguous information. The reason is that face-to-face communication can provide non-verbal messages including gestures, eye contact, touch, and body movement. However, the virtual communications, such as email, only have verbal information which will make team members more misunderstanding of the knowledge due to their different comprehension of the same words. On the other hand, the understanding of professional standards shows no difference between face-to-face interaction and virtual communications.

Van der Zwaard and Bannink (2014) examined the effect of video call compared with face-to-face communication on the negotiation of meaning between native speakers and non-native speakers of English. Face-to-face interaction provides individuals who use English as the second language both intentional and unintentional actions which could enhance the comprehension of the chat in English. Individuals are more honest in understanding when they are in face-to-face interaction than in video call due to the potential loss of face issues for the non-native language speakers during the video call. As a result, face-to-face interaction has a more positive influence on the negotiation of meaning than virtual communications such as the video call.

References

Further reading
M. Storper and A.J. Venables (2004), "Buzz: Face-To-Face Contact and the Urban Economy", Journal of Economic Geography, vol. 4, nº 4, pp. 351–370.

Human communication